Dr. D. may refer to:

Dr Disrespect, an American video game streamer
Dorothy Lavinia Brown (1914–2004), American surgeon, teacher and politician
Dale Archer (born 1956), American physician and television personality
Dr. Demento (born 1941), American disc jockey
Dr. Dre (born 1965), the rapper/producer
Doctor Dré (born 1963), American radio personality and MTV VJ
Dr. Heinz Doofenshmirtz, a character from the American animated television series Phineas and Ferb and Milo Murphy's Law
"Dr. D" David Schultz, American professional wrestler
"Dr. D.", a song by The Mighty Mighty Bosstones from More Noise and Other Disturbances
Dr Dee, an opera created by Rufus Norris and Damon Albarn